Mr. Murder is a 1969 Hindi suspense thriller directed by Nisar Ahmed Ansari and starring himself along with Chand Usmani.

Soundtrack

References

External links

Films scored by Sonik-Omi
1969 films
1960s Hindi-language films
1960s thriller films